Nathaniel M. Minkoff (February 14, 1893 – January 16, 1984) was an American labor leader and politician from New York.

Life
He was born on February 14, 1893, in the Russian Empire, the son of Mandel Minkoff. He became an accountant. In 1913, he married Rebecca Edid.

He was Secretary and Treasurer of Local 9 of the International Ladies Garment Workers Union from 1913 to 1919; and Director of the Records and Statistical Department of ILGWU from 1920 to 1925. Afterwards he was Secretary and Treasurer of the Joint Board of the Dress and Waistmakers Union of Greater New York, affiliated with ILGWU and the American Federation of Labor.

Minkoff was a member of the New York State Assembly in 1938, elected in November 1937 on the American Labor and Socialist tickets in the 5th assembly district of the Bronx. During the legislative session he was the Leader of the American Labor group consisting of five assemblymen. Minkoff was defeated for re-election in 1938 and 1940.

In April 1939, his only son, Secretary of the New York State Health Commission Saul N. Minkoff died aged 24 after an appendectomy.

He died on January 16, 1984; and was buried at the Mount Carmel Cemetery in Flushing, Queens.

Sources

External links
 

1893 births
1984 deaths
Members of the New York State Assembly
American Labor Party politicians
Emigrants from the Russian Empire to the United States
20th-century American politicians
Politicians from the Bronx